Brian Lanker (August 31, 1947 – March 13, 2011) was an American photographer. He won the 1973 Pulitzer Prize for Feature Photography for a black-and-white photo essay on childbirth for The Topeka Capital-Journal, including the photograph "Moment of Life". Lanker died at his home in Eugene, Oregon on March 13, 2011, after a brief bout of pancreatic cancer. He was 63.

His work appeared in Life and Sports Illustrated, as well as book projects, including I Dream a World: Portraits of Black Women Who Changed America, and Track Town, USA. He was the graphics director for The Register-Guard newspaper in Eugene from 1974 to 1982. He received a Candace Award from the National Coalition of 100 Black Women in 1991.

Lanker is the father of musician Dustin Lanker.

Works

See also
Ruby Middleton Forsythe, one of Lanker's subjects in I Dream a World

References

External links
Brian Lanker Photography (official website)

1947 births
2011 deaths
Pulitzer Prize for Feature Photography winners
Artists from Eugene, Oregon
Photographers from Oregon
Journalists from Oregon
Deaths from pancreatic cancer
20th-century American photographers
20th-century American male artists
20th-century American journalists
American male journalists
21st-century American photographers
21st-century American male artists
21st-century American journalists